Jacques-Olivier Paviot  (born 19 December 1976 in Roubaix) is a French former footballer.

Paviot spent the latter years of his career in Greece where he achieved celebrity status for his special talent, which was named by the acclaimed Greek radio sports show "Fight Club" as "koukouna". Paviot's koukouna is still mentioned several times every day, mostly in the three-verse poems that the audience sends as contributions for the last half hour of the show.

External links
zerozero 
Profile at France football 
Profile at foot mercato 

1976 births
Living people
French footballers
French expatriate footballers
Expatriate footballers in Greece
FC Mulhouse players
Levadiakos F.C. players
Pau FC players
Xanthi F.C. players
Ionikos F.C. players
Ilisiakos F.C. players
SO Romorantin players
CO Saint-Dizier players
Association football defenders